Khusi is a autobiographical book by Vijay Kumar Pandey. It was published in 2014 by FinePrint Publications and won the prestigious Madan Puraskar that year. The title of the book means happiness in Nepali language.

Synopsis 
Pandey is a Nepalese television presenter. The book depicts his story and is  collection of his various experiences.

Reception 
The book won the Madan Puraskar award for 2014.

See also 

 Antarmanko Yatra
 Chhuteka Anuhar
 Yaar

References 

Nepalese books
21st-century Nepalese books
Nepalese non-fiction books
Nepalese non-fiction literature
Madan Puraskar-winning works